Bart Goosens (born 5 January 1985) is a Belgian professional footballer who currently plays for Lommel in the Belgian Second Division, as a defender. His previous teams include Gent and Roeselare, with which he played in the Belgian Pro League.

References
Guardian Football

1985 births
Living people
Belgian footballers
Association football midfielders
K.A.A. Gent players
K.S.V. Roeselare players
Lommel S.K. players
Belgian Pro League players
Challenger Pro League players
Place of birth missing (living people)
Association football defenders